Kotorsko is a  village in the municipality of Doboj, Bosnia and Herzegovina.

About
Kotorsko is a peaceful village with bars, shops, salons, ambulance and dentist and many other institutions. Kotorsko as effected and left partially derelict by the Bosnian war in the 1990s.  Many people fled from Kotorsko and while some returned others haven't because of the financial situation in Bosnia and Herzegovina and are now living all over Europe.  Kotorsko is currently home to 1,400 people and is growing. Most of the residents are ethnic Bosniaks though a few hundred ethnic Serbian refugees settled there after war.

References

Villages in Republika Srpska
Populated places in Doboj